The Cordillera Negra (Spanish for "black range"), Yana Walla in qechua is part of the Cordillera Occidental, one of three mountain ranges in the Andes of west central Peru. It is almost entirely located within the Ancash Region.

The range extends over an area about 230 km long and 25–40 km wide, stretching in a NNW-SSE direction parallel to the Pacific coast, its ridge is about 60 km from the coastline. It is part of the Andes mountain range which inland borders on the Costa, the narrow strip of coastal deserts along the South American coast. In the north and east the range is bordered by the Santa River which crosses the coastal ridge at 8° 45' S and runs parallel to the Cordillera Negra for almost all its length. In the south the range is bordered by the Patiwillka River at 10° 30'. In the central part of the range near Huaráz, Casma River breaks through the ridge of the range.

The Cordillera Negra has rocky peaks with very little winter snowfall. The gullies of the Cordillera Negra are gloomy and dark. Most of them are dry or their flow is scarce.

The Santa River separates the Cordillera Negra from the Cordillera Blanca, a snow-covered range rising up to 6,768 m in the east almost parallel to it. Most of the year it has no snow although it rises up to 5,181 m in its highest parts. It intercepts the warmth from the Pacific Ocean, causing the line of perpetual snow sinking as low as 5,100 m in the Cordillera Blanca.

Today the Cordillera Negra is sparsely inhabited by a mainly indigenous population growing wheat, maize and oats at an elevation of well above 4,000 m. The range is rich in mineral resources like gold, silver and copper.

Mountains 
Other mountains are listed below:

 Kankawa, 
 Qarwaqucha, 
 Rumi Cruz, 
 Cerro Rico, 
 Akapa Ranin, 
 Kushuru, 
 Q'iruqucha, 
 Wank'ap'iti, 
 Puka Hirka, 
 Chunta, 
 Ichik Wiri, 
 Kankawa Punta, 
 Kushuru Punta, 
 Mashma Chaka, 
 Mata Mata, 
 Millishqucha, 
 Millpuq, 
 Parya, 
 Pillaka, 
 Puka Allpa, 
 Puka Punta, 
 Shinwaqucha, 
 Simiyuq Wank'a, 
 Yana Yaku, 
 Wanaku, 
 Yana Mach'ay, 
 Yuraq Punta, 
 Puka Qaqa, 
 Chunta Punta, 
 Kima Tullpa, 
 Kiswar, 
 Kunkush, 
 Kunkush Kancha, 
 Kuntur Qaqa, 
 Kushuru Hirka, 
 Lima Hirka, 
 Minas Hirka, 
 Parya, 
 Puka Hirka, 
 Puka Ranra, 
 Pukaqucha, 
 Puma Puñunan, 
 Phiruru Punta, 
 Qaqa Rumi Kunka, 
 Qulluta, 
 Sach'a Hirka, 
 Simiyuq Wank'a, 
 Ututu Hirka, 
 Wallpaq Sillu Punta, 
 Wishka, 
 Yana Kunkush, 
 Yana Mach'ay, 
 Yanaqucha, 
 Hatun Kunka, 
 Isku Pata, 
 Puma Wayin, 
 Qullpa Hirka, 
 Tarush Qhawana, 
 T'uquyuq, 
 Wamp'u, 
 Yuraq Yaku, 
 Kuntur Wayin, 
 Putaqa, 
 Llaksa Hirka, 
 Wamp'u, 
 Hatun Hirka, 

The highest pass road of the Cordillera Negra is the Wank'ap'iti pass at 4,680 m above sea level.

Routes
The route Casma-Huaraz is not a very highly travelled road. The highway begins with a paved path that arrives up to Yaután. Then it quickly begins to ascend through an unpaved path by the sides of the Cordillera Negra, following the course of the Casma River. This route becomes more steep once it arrives to Pariacoto. Along the road, there are not important towns at all, except for Pira that offers some traveler's services.

This route, extremely steep and narrow, goes between big abysses and gullies. It can be seen small rural districts with chakras (smallholdings) that have been sown with potatoes, wheat, barley and other food products. It can also be seen livestock and a lot of human activity.

Guitarrero Cave
In the 1960s, the Guitarrero Cave was discovered on the northern edges of Cordillera Negra, a cave containing bones of mastodon and llama and suggesting human occupation as far back as 10,950 to 10,230 BC.

References 

This article mainly uses a wide variety of maps as sources.

Mountain ranges of the Andes
Mountain ranges of Peru
Mountain ranges of Ancash Region